Werry Darta Taifur (born 29 November 1960 in Lima Puluh Kota, West Sumatra) is an Indonesian economist and professor who is currently serving as the Rector of Andalas University. He was sworn into office by Minister of Education Mohammad Nuh on 21 November 2011.

After graduating from the Faculty of Economics, Andalas University in Padang, Werry pursued his study at Flinders University, Adelaide, Australia. He continued his education at the University of Malaya, Kuala Lumpur where he obtained his masters and PhD degrees.

References 

(2006–October 2011)

Indonesian economists
Minangkabau people
1960 births
University of Malaya alumni
Living people